Zylks is an unincorporated community in Caddo Parish, Louisiana, United States.

References

Unincorporated communities in Caddo Parish, Louisiana
Unincorporated communities in Louisiana
Populated places in Ark-La-Tex
Unincorporated communities in Shreveport – Bossier City metropolitan area